Schwarzbach is a German surname. Notable people with the surname include:

Fred Schwarzbach, American academic
Julia Schwarzbach (born 1989), German weightlifter
Yvette Kosmann-Schwarzbach (born 1941), French mathematician 

German-language surnames